P. R. Varalakshmi is an Indian actress. She was active in movies during the 1970s and 1980s. She was a prominent lead actress during the 1980s in Malayalam, Tamil, Kannada, and Telugu films. She has acted around 600  movies in all major south Indian languages. Her debut film was Vazhaiyadi Vazhai in 1972, directed by K. S. Gopalakrishnan.

She has acted with former Tamil Nadu Chief Minister MGR, former Tamil Nadu Chief minister Jayalalitha and Andhra Pradesh Chief Minister Rama Rao.

She has also acted with two Generations actors, with Muthuraman and his son Karthik, Sivaji Ganesan and his son Prabhu, Telugu superstar Krishna and his son Mahesh Babu. During her period she has acted as Heroine to famous heroes Gemini Ganesan, Kamal Haasan, AVM Rajan and so on.

Filmography

Tamil

Vazhaiyadi Vazhai (1972)
Ponvandu (1973)
Deiva Vamsam (1973)
Malai Naattu Mangai (1973)
Deiva Kuzhanthaigal (1973)
Ore Satchi (1974)
Naan Avanillai (1974)
Swathi Nakshathram (1974)
Tiger Thathachari (1974)
Cinema Paithiyam (1975)
Pattampoochi (1975)
Avalukku Aayiram Kangal (1975)
Dasavatharam (1976)
Veedu Varai Uravu (1976)
Navarathinam (1977)
Kalamadi Kalam (1977)
Munnooru Naal (1977)
Punniyam Seithaval (1977)
Shri Kanchi Kamakshi (1978)
Manidharil Ithanai Nirangala! (1978)
Mela Thalangal (1978)
Mayandi (1979) 
Nadagame Ulagam (1979)
Kandhar Alangaaram (1979)
Valli Mayil (1980)
Neer Nilam Neruppu (1980)
Valli Mayil (1980)
Raman Parasuraman (1980)
Kannadi (1981)
Sankarlal (1981)
Rajangam (1981)
Kalvadiyum Pookal (1983)
Nanayam Illatha Nanayam (1984)
Anbe Odi Vaa (1984)
Mayavi (1985)
Manamagale Vaa (1988)
Thaai Naadu (1989)
Pattanamthan Pogalamadi (1990)
Durga (1990)
Unna Nenachen Pattu Padichen (1992)
Naane Varuven (1992)
Vaa Magale Vaa (1994)
Jameen Kottai (1995)
Musthaffaa (1996)
Poove Unakkaga (1996)
Gopura Deepam (1997)
Thirupathi Ezhumalai Venkatesa (1999)
Padai Veetu Amman (2002)
Naan Avan Illai (2007)

Malayalam

Tharavattamma (1966)
Achante Bharya (1971) as Thankhamma
Panimudakku (1972)
Kaadu (1973) as Menon's daughter
Sreerama Hanumaan Yudham (1974)
Light House (1976) as Usha
Aval Oru Devaalayam (1977)
Ammaayi Amma (1977)
Beena (1978)
Avalku Maranamilla (1978)
Ival Oru Naadody (1979)
Jimmy (1979)
Kazhukan (1979)
Sukhathinte Pinnale (1979) as Kalyani
Aval Niraparathi (1979)
Irumbazhikal (1979)
Oru Varsham Oru Maasam (1980)
Swattu (1980)
Lava (1980)
Kodumudikal (1980) as sarojini
Agnisaram (1981)
Jumbulingam (1982)
Chambalkadu (1982) 
Panchajanyam (1982 film)
Kolakkomaban (1983)
Angam (1983)
Himam (1983) as Sharada
Manasse Ninakku Mangalam (1984)
Thozhil Allengil Jail (1985)
Kulam (1997)
Janakeeyam (2003) as Surya's mother

Hindi
 Sita Swayamvar (1976) 
 Devi Durga Shakti (2001)
 Pardhai Kee Pichai

Kannada
 Chovkadha Deepa (1969)
 Bethadha Bairava (1973)
 Rajanarthakiya Rahasya (1976)
 Bengaluru Bhootha (1976) 
 Baddi Bangaramma (1984)
 Police Papanna (1984)
 Sangliyana (1988)
 Avane Nanna Ganda (1989)

Telugu
 Sri Krishnavataram (1967)
 Koduku Kodalu (1972) as Vasundhara
 Dhanama? Daivama? (1973) as Shanti
 Manushullo Devudu (1974)
 Inthi Kodhaluu (1974)
 Thota Ramudu (1975)
 Jebu Donga (1975)
Maya Machindhra (1975)
 Ee Kalapu Pillalu (1976)
 Sita Kalyanam (1976)
 Bhakta Kannappa (1976) 
 Swargam (1981)
 Gadasari Atta Sogasari Kodalu (1981)
 Kalavari Samsaram (1982)
 Mayuri (1984)
 Illu Illalu Pillalu (1988)
 Station Master (1988)
 Sri Devi Kamakshi (1989)
 Chennapatnam Chinnollu (1989)
 Idem Pellam Baboi (1990)
 Samsarala Mechanic (1992) as Sumathi
 Ankuram (1993)

Television serials

References

External links

Actresses in Malayalam cinema
Indian film actresses
Actresses in Tamil cinema
Actresses in Kannada cinema
Actresses in Telugu cinema
Year of birth missing
20th-century Indian actresses
Actresses in Tamil television
Actresses in Telugu television